Alain Fauré (1 October 1962 – 12 July 2018) was a French politician who served as a Deputy for Ariège's 2nd constituency in the National Assembly of France from 2012 to 2017 and as Mayor of Les Pujols from 2001 to 2014.

References

See also 

 List of deputies of the 14th National Assembly of France

1962 births
2018 deaths
Socialist Party (France) politicians
Deputies of the 14th National Assembly of the French Fifth Republic
Mayors of places in Occitania (administrative region)
People from Ariège (department)